The Idaho Legislature consists of the upper Idaho Senate and the lower Idaho House of Representatives. Idaho is divided into 35 legislative districts, which each elect one senator and two representatives. There are no term limits for either chamber.

The crossing of upper and lower house districts into a single constituency is found in seven U.S. state legislatures: Idaho, Arizona, Maryland, New Jersey, North Dakota, South Dakota, and Washington. Based on 2010 census data, each legislative district in the state of Idaho had approximately 44,788 residents.

History 
The first Idaho legislature convened in December 1890.

Elections and composition 
Members of the Idaho Legislature were originally elected by county, but in recent times districts apportioned by population have replaced representation by county.

Today members of the Idaho Legislature are elected from 35 districts throughout the state. Some districts include several counties, while others are located entirely within a single county. Ada County, the state's largest by population, currently has nine legislative districts within its boundaries (as of the 2010 redistricting, Ada County has Legislative Districts 14, 15, 16 17, 18, 19, 20, 21 and 22.)

All 105 members are elected simultaneously every two years on the same day as the federal election day in early November.

Districts 
Each district is represented by one senator and two representatives. Idaho has fourteen committees in the House of Representatives and ten committees in the Senate. Currently, there are thirty-five members in the Senate with twenty-six men and nine women. The House of Representatives also currently holds seventy members with forty-six men and twenty-four women.

Districts are reapportioned every 10 years. The next reapportionment is expected to occur after the 2020 census and take effect as of the 2022 election.

In the 1980s voters elected legislators from two districts, a smaller local district and a larger "floterial" district which often encompassed an entire region of the state. Legislative seats in floterial districts were last contested in 1990. Today floterial districts are prohibited by the Idaho Constitution.

Responsibilities 
According to the Legislature's website, the Idaho Legislature is responsible for translating the public will into policy for the state, levying taxes, appropriating public funds, and overseeing the administration of state agencies. These responsibilities are carried out through the legislative process - laws passed by elected representatives of the people, legislators.

Location and time of operation 

The Idaho Legislature normally convenes at the Idaho State Capitol in downtown Boise. The Legislature meets annually from January until mid-March, although sessions have been known to last into May. The Governor of Idaho may also call special sessions at any time.

The Idaho State Capitol Commission was created by Governor Phil Batt in 1998.  The Commission undertook the leading role of extensively remodeling the capitol building starting in 2007.  The 2008 and 2009 sessions of the Idaho Legislature met in converted courtrooms in the old Ada County Courthouse.  The capitol building was official re-opened and re-dedicated on January 9, 2010.

See also
 List of Idaho state legislatures

References

External links
 

 
Bicameral legislatures